The Ukrainian Physics and Mathematics Lyceum (UPML) is a boarding high school and one of the few science magnet schools in Ukraine. It is located in Kyiv and affiliated with Taras Shevchenko National University of Kyiv.

History
The lyceum was established in 1963 and was known as the Republican Specialized Physics and Mathematics Boarding School until 1992. In total 5,324 students graduated from UPML by 2013. Many of the alumni are winners of National Ukrainian and International Science Olympiads: only between 1963 and 2005 as many as 65 UPML students were awarded medals at International Olympiads in Physics (IPhO), Mathematics (IMO), Chemistry (IChO) and Informatics (IOI), 148 – at all-Soviet Olympiads, 696 – at Ukrainian National Olympiads.

The lyceum is currently publicly funded in its entirety and suffers from regular budget shortfalls. Nevertheless, tuition, board and lodging are free of charge for all admitted students.

In 2007 UPML became the first Ukrainian school with its name visible from outer space.

Alumni
Students of the lyceum study from 8th through 11th grades. Due to the organizational affiliation students of the graduating class (11th grade) have the right to be admitted to engineering and natural sciences departments of Taras Shevchenko National University of Kyiv through a preferential admission process. Between 2000 and 2005 all lyceum graduates were admitted to top universities in Ukraine and overseas: about 90% of them went on to study at Taras Shevchenko National University of Kyiv, 6–7% at Moscow Institute of Physics and Technology.

A growing number of the lyceum alumni continue their studies overseas: in the United States, Canada, Europe and Asia. Many alumni work in the IT industry and build their careers in the R&D sector.

See also 
 Lviv Physics and Mathematics Lyceum
 Kyiv Natural Science Lyceum No. 145

External links 
 Official website

References 

Schools in Kyiv
Educational institutions established in 1963
1963 establishments in Ukraine
Secondary schools in Ukraine